The Catterick Bridge Explosion occurred on 4 February 1944 in the railway sidings at  station, on the Richmond Branch Line/Catterick Camp Railway in North Yorkshire, England. It killed twelve people and injured more than a hundred. The incorrect loading of explosives into railway wagons is believed to have been the cause, but because of wartime restrictions, reporting of the event was not as widespread as it would have been had the explosion occurred in peacetime.

History
Just before 4:00 pm on 4 February 1944, a large explosion rocked the goods yard in Catterick Bridge railway station. Soldiers had been engaged in loading wagons with explosives which would have eventually been used in the D-Day effort. Speculation has been rife since about what caused the explosion with incorrect handling of the ammunition suggested. One witness recalled seeing the troops days before the explosion handling the ammunition carefully, with two men to a box. On the day of the explosion, the same witness observed the troops loading the ammunition only this time "they were practically throwing them" into the rail wagons. It was also put forward that a primed grenade was accidentally loaded in the consist, but the official inquiry apportioned no blame and listed all twelve deaths as accidental. Among those who died were the stationmaster of Catterick Bridge railway station and two female clerks from the goods office.

The explosion also caused significant damage to nearby buildings with the railway hotel being destroyed. The hotel was later raided for the beers in its cellars and its licence to sell alcohol only expired in 1984 as no-one bothered to have it rescinded. The site of the hotel is now the northwest corner of the Brompton-on-Swale traffic lights at the junction of the A6055 and the B6271. A taxi driver ran up the railway line waving a makeshift flag to warn an incoming train about the damage; the station was quite crowded with service personnel who were going on weekend leave, and trains were quite frequent on Friday afternoons.

A Military Court of Inquiry was convened to report on the disaster. The four army privates, (three of whom were from the Royal Pioneer Corps, with the fourth from the Royal Army Ordnance Corps) were loading the ammunition at the time of the explosion and were described as being "at the epicentre of the blast". Initially, due to their proximity to the centre of the explosion, their remains were not found, and three days later the Northern Despatch newspaper still listed them as being among the missing. Killed were listed as one Royal Air Force, one Military, three railway staff, three civilian and two unidentified.

Despite his own injuries, he helped to rescue other people and carried on with the rescue parties despite knowing that there was a great amount on unexploded ordnance in the vicinity. He was later awarded the Edward Medal by King George VI which was gazetted in June 1944. The medal is now in the possession of Richmond Council.

An inquest was held on the Saturday following (5 February 1944) on the eight identified dead casualties and a British Army report into the disaster was also convened, but due to wartime restrictions, its findings were not released to the inquiry or to the public.

Some of the dead are commemorated on the war memorial in Brompton-on-Swale, near to where the station at Catterick Bridge was located.

References

External links
The VC page on John Weller

1944 disasters in the United Kingdom
United Kingdom in World War II
Explosions in England
1944 in England
Disasters in Yorkshire
Railway accidents and incidents in Yorkshire
Railway accidents in 1944
Accidents and incidents involving London and North Eastern Railway